Poona Piagapo, officially the Municipality of Poona Piagapo (Maranao: Inged a Poona Piagapo;), is a 4th class municipality in the province of Lanao del Norte, Philippines. According to the 2020 census, it has a population of 29,183 people.

History
Under Presidential Decree No. 916, 31 March 1976, the town of Poona Piagapo was created from the following:
 The barangays of Tangklao, Piangamanganan, Kadayonan, Lupitan, Punud, Kabasaran, Pantau-Raya, Kablanga, Pantaon, Nunungen, Lumbaka-Ingud, and Tadoken in the municipality of Pantau-Ragat,
 the barangays of Lumbaka-Ingud, Pened, Domiorog, Daramba, Nunang, Sulo, Caromatan, Tagoranao, Madamba, Lumbatan, Madaya, Bobong-Dinaig, Linindingan, Maliwanag, Dinaig, Timbangalan, Pindolonan, and Alowin in the municipality of Matungao,

all in the province of Lanao del Norte, are hereby separated from said municipalities and constituted into a distinct and independent municipality to be known as the municipality of Poona-Piagapo in the province of Lanao del Norte. The seat of the new municipality shall be located at the barangay of Poona-Piagapo to be established within the proximity of Barangay Lumbaka-Ingud.

Geography

Barangays
Poona Piagapo is politically subdivided into 26 barangays.

Climate

Demographics

Economy

Government
Mayors after People Power Revolution 1986:

Vice Mayors after People Power Revolution 1986:

References

External links
 Poona Piagapo Profile at the DTI Cities and Municipalities Competitive Index
 [ Philippine Standard Geographic Code]
 P.D. 916 - CREATING THE MUNICIPALITY OF POONA PIAGAPO IN THE PROVINCE OF LANAO DEL NORTE
Philippine Census Information
Local Governance Performance Management System

Municipalities of Lanao del Norte
Establishments by Philippine presidential decree